D.L. Ligon Coliseum has been home to the Midwestern State University athletic department for 53 years, and it is the site of all MSU home basketball and volleyball events.

Built in 1969, the facility was renamed from MSU Coliseum to D.L. Ligon Coliseum on October 18, 1975 in honor of the legendary MSU employee. Ligon served in many capacities during his 50-plus years at MSU, including stints as acting president, vice president, professor, coach and sports information director.

The 3,640-seat arena is air-conditioned and has a hardwood playing surface. The building also features a practice gymnasium, weight room, wellness center, training room, locker rooms and classrooms, as well as MSU's athletic offices.

On November 22, 2002, the playing court in the Coliseum was officially named Gerald Stockton Court in honor of Dr. Gerald Stockton, who led MSU from 1970–1994 to a 493–328 record with his "Dome Magic".

References

Midwestern State University
Buildings and structures in Wichita Falls, Texas
Basketball venues in Texas
Indoor arenas in Texas
Volleyball venues in Texas
Sports venues in Texas
College volleyball venues in the United States
College basketball venues in the United States
Continental Basketball Association venues
Sports venues completed in 1969
1969 establishments in Texas